Li Hui may refer to:

 Li Hui (Three Kingdoms) (died 231), minister of the Kingdom of Shu during the Three Kingdoms period of China
 Li Hui (Tang Dynasty), Tang Dynasty chancellor
 Li Hui (Northern Qi), official of the Northern Qi Dynasty
 Li Hui (wrestler) (born 1985), female Chinese freestyle wrestler
 Li Hui (swimmer), female Chinese swimmer, former world record holder in the short-course 50-metre backstroke
 Li Hui (artist), artist, based in Beijing
 Li Hui (diplomat), diplomat of the PRC
 Li Hui (footballer) (born 1960), Chinese football forward